Zhivka Klinkova (30 July 1924 – 23 December 2002) was a Bulgarian composer, pianist and conductor.

She was born in Samokov, Bulgaria, and graduated from the Sofia Academy of Music in 1951, after studying with Parashkev Hadjiev for composition and Dimitar Nenov for piano. She continued her studies with Rudolf Wagner-Régeny and Boris Blacher at the Berlin Hochschule für Musik. She worked as conductor of the Kutev Folkloric Philharmonica from 1951 to 1960, and composed works for the ensemble's repertoire.

Works
Selected works include:
Petko Samohvalko [Boastful Petko] (children’s op, N. Trendafilova), 1956
Kaliakra (ballet, S. Aladjov), 1966,
Than saen [Vietnamese Poem] (ballet, L.N. Kanh), 1972
Quenny, the Little Negro (children’s ballet, Klinkova), 1973
Isle of Dreams (musical, P. Panchev), Teplice, 1978
The Most Improbable (fairy-tale op, Klinkova), 1980
Cyril and Methodius (opera, V. Markovski and J. Gyermek), 1981
Bydgoszcz, 1986
Vassil Levski (opera, Klinkova), 1992
Olimpijski ustrem, Sanjat na Kuberten [Olympic Endeavour, Coubertin’s Dream] (rock op-ballet, Klinkova), 1995
Sofia (opera, Klinkova), 1996
Sinfonietta no.1, 1960
Bulgarian Sym. Suite no.1, 1963
Violin Concerto, 1964
Ballad, 1972
Concerto, 2 violin, strings, 1973
Symphony no.2, 1974
Cantata, chorus, orchestra, 1982
Pianoforte Concerto, strings, 1992
Pianoforte Sonata, 1950
Trio, bagpipes, 1955
Sonata, violin, piano, 1963
Sonata, flute, viola, 1969
Duo, 2 kavals, 1972
Trio, flute, oboe, bassoon, 1974
7 Frescoes, 2 flutes, 1975
8 Preludes, 2 flutes, 1975
10 Pieces, folk ensemble, 1978

References

1924 births
2002 deaths
People from Samokov
20th-century classical composers
Women classical composers
Bulgarian classical composers
Bulgarian opera composers
Berlin University of the Arts alumni
Women opera composers
20th-century women composers